The Royal Dutch Rowing Federation (Dutch: Koninklijke Nederlandse Roeibond, a.k.a. KNRB) is the federation of all Dutch rowing clubs. It was founded in 1917.

The federation is a member of the NOC*NSF, and is entitled to nominate candidates and teams to participate in the Olympic Games.

The headquarters of the Royal Dutch Rowing Federation are located at the Bosbaan in Amstelveen.

External links
 Royal Dutch Rowing Federation official site

Rowing in the Netherlands
Rowing
Netherlands
Organisations based in the Netherlands with royal patronage
1917 establishments in the Netherlands